Yesterday, Today, and Tomorrow is a 1984 country double album by Bill Anderson. The album produced three charting singles: "Wino the Clown" (#58), "Pity Party" (#62) and "When You Leave That Way You Can Never Go Back" (#75).

Track listing

New Hits
	"Pity Party" – 3:15
	"This Is the Goodbye (To End All Goodbyes)" – 3:23
	"Wino the Clown" – 3:56
	"I Never Lie to Ruby" – 3:19
	"Country Music Died Today" – 3:25
	"When You Leave That Way (You Can Never Go Back)" – 3:45 (Steve Clark, Johnny MacRae)
	"With Her" – 2:42
	"Lorene" – 3:04
	"Second Thoughts" – 2:31
	"The Years Fall Away" – 3:20
Past Hits
	"Don't She Look Good" – 2:07
	"Still" – 2:49
	"Double "S"" – 4:30
	"Wild Weekend" – 2:20
	"Mama Sang a Song" – 3:27
	"Quits" – 2:26
	"Golden Guitar" – 4:04
	"Po' Folks" – 2:56
	"Five Little Fingers" – 3:12
	"I Love You Drops" – 2:36

References

1984 albums
Bill Anderson (singer) albums